"Rosalía" is a song recorded by Dominican singer Juan Luis Guerra for his seventh studio album, Bachata Rosa (1990), included as its first and opening track. It was composed and produced by Juan Luis Guerra and his band 4.40. The track is an upbeat merengue about a lover named Rosalia.The track contains poetic metaphors and lyrics describing that he loves her.Following the success of Bachata Rosa, the track charted inside of Panama Airplay.Eventually, the track was included on the live album Entre Mar y Palmeras (2021) and served as the opening track on the setlist of the tour of the same name.

Charts

References 

1990 songs
Juan Luis Guerra songs
Songs written by Juan Luis Guerra